"The Limo" is the 11th episode in the first season of the television series How I Met Your Mother. It originally aired on December 19, 2005.

Plot 
Trying to avoid the usual letdown of New Year's Eve, Ted rents a limo for his friends so that they can party together. Robin has plans with her rich boyfriend, Derek, but Ted, Lily, Marshall, and Barney plan to attend five parties in the three hours before midnight to find the best party to be at to begin the new year. With Ranjit as their limo driver and Barney's "Get Psyched" mix CD to amp them up, the group goes to the first party where they pick up Ted's coworker Marybeth (Kathleen Rose Perkins), who has been flirting with him at the office. Barney also finds a date, a woman with a Russian-like accent named Natalya. Lily complains that her shoes are hurting her feet, but Ted asks that she power through the pain and they head to party number two.

Disappointed with party number two, the gang heads to party number three, leaving Natalya behind because no one except Barney liked her. Robin calls Ted asking if they could pick her up because Derek had to work late and canceled their plans. Even though the extra stop jeopardizes the schedule, Ted cannot refuse to pick up Robin. Robin joins the group and her disappointment caused by her canceled date brings down the mood. Ted tries to lift Robin's spirits by saying that he will kiss her at midnight and suggests that they go to Gray's Papaya. Lily returns to the apartment to change her shoes, intending to catch up with the group at party number three, while everyone else gets hot dogs. Lily tries to wish Marshall a happy new year in case she can't rejoin the group, but Marshall says that they will find each other.

The limo heads to party number three when Marshall sees Moby (J. P. Manoux) out the window of the parked limo. Ted asks Moby if he wants a ride to the party that he's going to and once inside the limo the group wangles an invitation to Moby's party. Worried that Lily won't find them and unable to reach her on her cell phone, Marshall leaves the limo to find Lily. The group heads to Moby's party, but discover that he is not Moby (nor 'Tony', but Eric) when he brandishes a gun and rants crazily. As they drop off Not Moby at his party, Marshall's cell phone that he accidentally left in the limo rings. Barney answers the call from Lily and tells her that Marshall is looking for her at party number three. Lily doesn't see Marshall but she does see Not Moby walking into the party. Ted tells her to leave the party quickly and when she rejoins the group they realize that Lily accidentally went to party number four, which coincidentally is Not Moby's party. The group heads to party number three to find Marshall. Barney realizes that Not Moby took his "Get Psyched" mix just as the limo gets a flat tire. While Ranjit fixes the tire, Barney laments the loss of his CD. To cheer up everyone, Ted and Robin begin singing the first song from the "Get Psyched" mix. Recognizing that Ted is in love with Robin, Marybeth decides to leave the group.

Still stuck with a flat tire and only 15 minutes until midnight, Ted suggests that the group begin walking so that they can get to party number three by 12:45 and celebrate the New Year in central time. As Lily tries to find Marshall by yelling his name, Barney tells Ted to stop trying so hard-—he can't keep New Year's Eve from being what it is, the biggest letdown of the year. Just as Ted is about to give up, they hear Marshall yelling Lily's name. Marshall runs up to the limo and tells the group that when he couldn't find Lily at party number three he walked to party number four (Not Moby's party) where he heard Barney's mix CD playing and he swiped it, and got his shirt signed by "not Moby" as "Eric". Marshall then went to party number five, which was awesome, and says that they need to be at party number five at midnight. With eight minutes until midnight, everyone climbs in the limo—-where they find Natalya who had been sleeping in the front seat—-and they head to party number five.

With three minutes until midnight, the limo is stuck in traffic. Accepting that the group won't make it to party number five, Ted opens a bottle of champagne and pours everyone a glass, saying that they have a great party in the limo. Derek appears at the limo's window, having left his business meeting early to be with Robin at midnight. As the countdown to midnight begins with everyone in the limo paired off except for Ted, he leaves the limo. To Ted's surprise, Robin follows him, saying that she hadn't forgotten their deal to kiss each other at midnight, and they share a kiss.

Awards 

 Director of Photography Chris La Fountaine won an Emmy for Outstanding Cinematography for a Multi-Camera Series for this episode.

Soundtrack
 "You Give Love a Bad Name" by Bon Jovi (a recurring track from "Get Psyched" mix CD)

References

External links 
 

How I Met Your Mother (season 1) episodes
2005 American television episodes
New Year television episodes